A cultural icon is a person or an artifact that is identified by members of a culture as representative of that culture. The process of identification is subjective, and "icons" are judged by the extent to which they can be seen as an authentic symbol of that culture. When individuals perceive a cultural icon, they relate it to their general perceptions of the cultural identity represented. Cultural icons can also be identified as an authentic representation of the practices of one culture by another.

In popular culture and elsewhere, the term "iconic" is used to describe a wide range of people, places, and things. Some commentators believe that the word "iconic" is overused.

Examples

According to the Canadian Journal of Communication, academic literature has described all of the following as "cultural icons": "Shakespeare, Oprah, Batman, Anne of Green Gables, the Cowboy, the 1960s female pop singer, the horse, Las Vegas, the library, the Barbie doll, DNA, and the New York Yankees." 

A web-based survey was set up in 2006 allowing the public to nominate their ideas for national icons of England, and the results show the range of different types of icons associated with an English view of English culture. One example is the red AEC Routemaster London double decker bus.

Matryoshka dolls are seen internationally as cultural icons of Russia. In the former Soviet Union, the hammer and sickle symbol and statues of Vladimir Lenin instead represented the country's most prominent cultural icons.

The values, norms, and ideals represented by a cultural icon vary among people who subscribe to it and more widely among others who may interpret cultural icons as symbolizing quite different values. Thus an apple pie is a cultural icon of the United States, but its significance varies among Americans.

National icons can become targets for those opposing or criticising a regime, for example, crowds destroying statues of Lenin in Eastern Europe after the fall of communism or burning the American flag to protest US actions abroad.

Religious icons can also become cultural icons in societies where religion and culture are deeply entwined, such as representations of the Madonna in societies with a strong Catholic tradition.

Criticism
Describing something as iconic or as an icon has become very common in the popular media. This has drawn criticism from some. For example, a writer in Liverpool Daily Post calls "iconic" "a word that makes my flesh creep", a word "pressed into service to describe almost anything." Mark Larson of the Christian Examiner labeled "iconic" as an overused word, finding over 18,000 uses of "iconic" in news stories alone, with another 30,000 for "icon".

Types
 Architectural icon
 Gay icon
 Horror icon
 Pop icon

References

Bibliography
 
 
 
 
 *

External links
 Our New Icons by The Daily Telegraph
 Nothing and no one are Off Limits in an Age of Iconomania by The Age
 British Postal Museum & Archive: Icons of England
 Culture24: Icons of England

Cultural history